Piskó is a village in Baranya county, Hungary, a small region of Sellyei.

Populated places in Baranya County